Paint 3D is a raster graphics and 3D computer graphics application which is a refresh of Microsoft Paint. It is one of several 3D modeling and printing applications (formatted under 3MF) introduced or improved with the Windows 10 Creators Update, including View 3D, Windows Mixed Reality, Holograms, along with the CAD programs 3D Builder and 2D Builder.

Developed by Microsoft's Lift London studio, Paint 3D incorporates features of the Microsoft Paint and 3D Builder applications to combine a lightweight hybrid 2D-3D editing experience that allows users to pull in a variety of shapes from the app, their personal computer, and Microsoft's OneDrive service.

History 

In May 2016, a leaked Universal Windows Platform version of Microsoft Paint was revealed with a new hybrid ribbon-sidebar interface and some support for 3D objects. Microsoft rolled out a dummy app called Newcastle through the Windows Store to replace installations of the leaked build.

In October 2016, a user on Twitter leaked out official tutorial videos of an upcoming version of Paint for Windows 10. The video showcases new features such as a completely redone interface with pen input in mind, as well as the ability to create and modify basic 3D models.

The Universal Windows Platform version was officially announced and released during a Surface event on October 26, 2016 as part of the keynote presentation on the Windows 10 Creators Update. The app was made available for Windows 10 users with a build number of 14800 or higher and coexists with the previous version of Paint as of build 14955. Microsoft revealed a community website for sharing Paint drawings, with a focus on the new 3D formats. In addition to the 3D format, this version introduced the ability to save transparent pixels in 2D drawings, clip art stickers, background removal, the ability to download and import community drawings from within the app, UWP sharing contracts silhouette ribbon icons, new flat sidebar icons a blue-purple in-app theme, the ability to change the backdrop, and informational videos. One of the videos establishes unambiguously that Paint 3D is the evolution of Microsoft Paint, showing older versions of Paint from Windows editions 1, 3.1, Vista, and 10.

Paint 3D was briefly made a replacement to Microsoft Paint, in Windows builds 14971 and 14986. However, due to complaints about the new interface and features missing in Paint 3D, the Windows team decided to allow the two apps to coexist.

Over the course of development the stickers subsections were rearranged, new stickers were added, additional classic 2D shapes were added, an option was added to disable the welcome screen, the scrollbars were improved, the ability to resize the canvas with a mouse was added, and stickers were enabled to stick automatically if the user switched to a different activity without clicking the stamp button.

Windows Insider chief Dona Sarkar confirmed that a Windows 10 Mobile version of Paint 3D has entered the alpha stage of development.

In the Windows 10 Fall Creators Update an updated version of Paint 3D was released in Windows Store. It allowed users to directly Upload or Download models from Remix 3D.

Paint 3D's most heavily promoted features are related to its support for 3D objects. Paint 3D ships with its own '3D library', which provides users with 3D stock people, animals, geometric shapes, text, and doodles. Users can rotate objects, adjust the placement of 3D object in all three dimensions, and apply 2D objects as stickers to 3D objects. The canvas itself can be rotated in 3D space or hidden, but it cannot
be rotated while the user is editing.

It includes many of the 2D objects from Microsoft Paint and new colorful "stickers", which are functionally similar to traditional 2D shapes, and patterns that can be applied to the background and 3D objects. 2D text is available, as well as 3D text.

Animations can be saved in 2D and 3D formats and shared using the Windows Share feature or OneDrive (purposed as a user-generated warehouse, replacing Remix3d.com). Because of these features, Microsoft included a license agreement that appears when the app is launched.

The user is greeted with a welcome screen with tutorials, information about Paint 3D, and options for opening or starting a project. The screen can be disabled and reenabled.

Like its predecessor, Paint 3D supports multiwindowing. Both support jumplists, but only Paint 3D displays 3D objects in its jumplist (other picture types are permissible).

Reception 
Paint 3D was praised for the new features it introduced, its role in Windows 10's evolving 3D support, the new user interface, improved stylus support, and a level of innovation not seen in the development of Microsoft Paint.  The app has gone on to be used in peripheral gaming, finding a niche in game design as well as general gameplay.

However, users criticized it on the Internet and in the Feedback Hub for lacking some of the features of Microsoft Paint, lack of 3D tools, and not being as ergonomically intuitive with a mouse & keyboard, particularly in the earliest iterations of the app.

See also 
 Tilt Brush
 ArtRage
 Unity (game engine)

Notes and references

External links 
 Paint 3D on Microsoft Store

2017 software
3D graphics software
Raster graphics editors
Windows components
Universal Windows Platform apps
Freeware